Arialis Josefa Gandulla Martínez (born 22 June 1995) is a Cuban-born Portuguese sprinter. She competed in the 200 metres at the 2015 World Championships in Beijing without advancing from the first round. At club level, she represents Benfica in Portugal.

International competitions

1Did not finish in the final

Personal bests
Outdoor
100 metres – 11.22 (Meeting de Salamanca, 2021)
200 metres – 23.08 (+1.6 m/s, Toronto 2015)

Personal life
Gandulla is married to Pedro Pichardo, with whom she has a daughter, Rosalis Maria.

References

Cuban female sprinters
Living people
Place of birth missing (living people)
1995 births
World Athletics Championships athletes for Cuba
Athletes (track and field) at the 2015 Pan American Games
Athletes (track and field) at the 2016 Summer Olympics
Olympic athletes of Cuba
Central American and Caribbean Games bronze medalists for Cuba
Competitors at the 2014 Central American and Caribbean Games
Central American and Caribbean Games medalists in athletics
Pan American Games competitors for Cuba
S.L. Benfica athletes
Olympic female sprinters